Éric Quintin (born 22 January 1967 in Aix-en-Provence) is a French handball player.

With the French national team, he won the bronze medal at the 1992 Summer Olympics, a silver medal at the 1993 World Championship, a gold medal at the 1994 Goodwill Games and at 1995 World Championship

With clubs, he mainly played for SMUC Marseille  who became OM-Vitrolles in 1991. With this club, he won the EHF Cup Winner's Cup, the French league in 1994, 1996 and the Coupe de France: in 1993 and 1995.

Accomplishments 
EHF Cup Winner's Cup:
 Winner (1): 1993 (as OMV)
 Runners-up (1): 1994 (as OMV)
French league:
 Winner (7): 1965, 1967, 1969, 1975, 1984 (as SMUC) ; 1994, 1996 (as OMV)
 Runners-up (3): 1983 (as SMUC) ; 1993, 1995 (as OMV)
Coupe de France:
 Winner (3): 1976 (as SMUC) ; 1993, 1995 (as OMV)
 Runners-up (2): 1992, 1996 (as OMV)

References

External links

1967 births
Living people
French male handball players
Olympic handball players of France
Handball players at the 1992 Summer Olympics
Olympic bronze medalists for France
Olympic medalists in handball
Medalists at the 1992 Summer Olympics